Thaker is a surname, and may refer to:

Pranjivan Vishwanath Thaker (circa 1860 – 1920), Diwan of the princely state of Vadia in Saurashtra, Gujarat the highest executive office under Rajput rule
Mahashankar Vishwanath Thaker (circa 1867 – 1902), Chief Treasurer of the princely state of Limbdi under Jhala Rajput rule
Dhirajlal Mahashankar Vishwanath Thaker (1897–1947), Paymaster General of the Port of Karachi; the largest wheat and cotton exporting port in British India prior to partition, currently the largest port in Pakistan
Dhirubhai Premshankar Thaker (born 1917), Chief Editor of the Gujarati Vishwakosh; Gujarat's first extensive encyclopedia in the Gujarati language with 25 volumes and over 23,000 articles, and winner of the 1994 Ranjitram Suvarna Chandrak; the highest literary award in Gujarati literature